Lemuel Punderson (October 20, 1824 - October 11, 1910) was an engraver and printer in the United States. He worked in New York City and then New Haven, Connecticut. Yale University has a collection of his papers. He did engravings from daguerrotype photographs.

Members of the Punderson family were among New Haven's earliest settlers. John Punderson was recorded as the last living in the city in 1904.

The book on the history and antiquities of New Haven he and John Warner Barber published in 1856 included an engraving of John Davenport. He also made an engraving of Yale College campus in New Haven showing trees and buildings on the campus. Punderson made an 1855 engraving of Matthew Fontaine Maury.

Punderson died in Springfield, Hampden, Massachusetts and is buried at Grove Street Cemetery in New Haven.

Bibliography
History and antiquities of New Haven, Conn., from its earliest settlement to the present time. With biographical sketches and statistical information of the public institutions, &c., &c. by L.S. Punderson and John Warner Barber, New Haven (1856)

References

External links

1824 births
1910 deaths
American engravers
19th-century American printmakers
19th-century lithographers
Artists from New York City
Artists from New Haven, Connecticut
People from Hampden County, Massachusetts